Richard Sheldon Palais  (born May 22, 1931) is a mathematician working in geometry who introduced the principle of symmetric criticality, the Mostow–Palais theorem, the Lie–Palais theorem, the Morse–Palais lemma, and the Palais–Smale compactness condition.

From 1965 to 1967 Palais was a Sloan Fellow. In 1970 he was an invited speaker (Banach manifolds of fiber bundle sections) at the International Congress of Mathematicians in Nice. From 1965 to 1982 he was an editor for the Journal of Differential Geometry and from 1966 to 1969 an editor for the Transactions of the American Mathematical Society. In 2010 he received a Lester R. Ford Award. In 2012 he became a fellow of the American Mathematical Society.

He obtained his Ph.D. from Harvard University in 1956 under the joint supervision of Andrew M. Gleason and George Mackey.

His doctoral students include Edward Bierstone, Leslie Lamport, Jill P. Mesirov, Chuu-lian Terng, and Karen Uhlenbeck.

Selected publications

Books
as editor: Seminar on the Atiyah-Singer Index Theorem, Annals of Mathematical Studies, no. 4, Princeton Univ. Press, 1964
as author:
A Global Formulation of the Lie Theory of Transformation Groups, Memoirs AMS 1957
The classification of G-Spaces, Memoirs AMS 1960
Foundations of Global Nonlinear Analysis, Benjamin 1968
The geometrization of physics, Tsinghua University Press 1981
Real algebraic differential topology, Publish or Perish 1981
with Chuu-Lian Terng: Critical point theory and submanifold geometry, Lecture Notes in Mathematics, vol.1353, Springer 1988
with Robert A. Palais: Differential Equations, Mechanic, and Computation, AMS 2009

Articles
 Richard Palais and Stephen Smale, A generalized Morse theory, Research Announcement, Bulletin of the American Mathematical Society 70 (1964), 165-172
 R. Palais, Morse Theory on Hilbert Manifolds, Topology 2 (1963), 299–340.
 R. Palais, Linear and Nonlinear Waves and Solitons, in The Princeton Companion to Mathematics, T. Gower Ed., Princeton Univ. Press 2008, 234-239
 R. Palais, The Symmetries of Solitons, Bulletin. Amer. Math. Soc., New Series 34, No. 4, 339-403 (1997) [ISSN 0273-0979],
 R. Palais, The Visualization of Mathematics: Towards a Mathematical Exploratorium, Notices Amer. Math. Soc., 46, No. 6 (June–July 1999,
 R. Palais, A Simple Proof of the Banach Contraction Principle, The Journal for Fixed Point Theory and its Applications, 2 (2007) 221–223,

A nearly complete list of all papers authored or co-authored by Richard Palais is available for downloading as PDF files at http://vmm.math.uci.edu/PalaisPapers

References

External links

Home page
Curriculum Vitae
Homepage of 3D-XplorMath, Mathematical Visualization software developed by R. Palais
Interview with the TeX Users Group

20th-century American mathematicians
21st-century American mathematicians
1931 births
Living people
Fellows of the American Mathematical Society
Brandeis University faculty
Harvard University alumni
Geometers
Topologists